Solveig is a female given name of Old Norse origin. It is most common in Denmark, Norway, Sweden, and Iceland, and it is also somewhat common in Germany and France.

Etymology 
The name consists of two parts, where both parts have different theorized origins.

 Sol-
 Old Norse salr "house, hall, home"
 Old Norse sól "sun"
 Old Norse sölr "sun-coloured, yellow"
 -veig
 Old Norse veig "strength"
 Old Norse víg "battle"
 Old Norse vígja "to butt"
 Old Norse väg "way"

Versions 
Generally speaking, the most common version is Solveig. However, alternative versions are used in Norway, Sweden, Denmark, Iceland, Germany, Latvia, and on the Faroe Islands, and to some extent in France.

Norwegian, Swedish, and Danish
 Solveig
 Sólveig
 Solvej
 Solvei
 Solveij
 Solveg

Icelandic
 Solveig
 Sólveig

Latvian and Lithuanian
 Solveiga

German and French
 Solveig

In fiction 
Solveig is a central character in the play Peer Gynt by Henrik Ibsen. She sings the famous "Solveig's Song" in Edvard Grieg's musical suite of the same name. Ibsen uses sun imagery in association to the character (scene 10, act 5), indicating that Ibsen may have favored the idea that the name is etymologically associated with the sun.

There is also a female central character in the Argentine novelist Leopoldo Marechal's Adán Buenosayres named Solveig Amundsen. Furthermore, Solveig is the main character and narrator of Matthew J. Kirby's Icefall.

Solveig is also one of the protagonists in Battlefield V, in the episode called "Nordlys".

Notable people called Solveig 
 Miklabæjar-Solveig, an Icelandic woman who lived in the late 18th century and is the subject of local folklore

Given name
 Sólveig Anspach, an Icelandic-French film director 
 Solveig Christov, a Norwegian novelist, writer of short stories and playwright
 Solveig Dommartin, a French actress
 Solveig Egman-Andersson, a Swedish artistic gymnast and Olympian 
 Solveig Guðmundsdóttir, an Icelandic heiress and landlady
 Solveig Gulbrandsen, a Norwegian footballer
 Solveig Gunbjørg Jacobsen
 Solveig Hedengran, a Swedish actress
 Solveig Heilo, also known as Sol Heilo, a Norwegian composer, artist, musician, music producer, arranger, designer
 Solveig Jülich, a Swedish historian of ideas, professor 
 Solveig Krey, a Norwegian naval officer
 Solveig Kringlebotn, a Norwegian operatic soprano singer
 Solveig Nordlund, a Swedish-Portuguese filmmaker
 Solveig Nordström, a Swedish archaeologist who developed her career in Spain
 Sólveig Pétursdóttir, an Icelandic politician a former speaker of the Althing, the Icelandic parliament
 Solveig Slettahjell, a Norwegian jazz singer
 Solveig Sollie, a Norwegian politician
 Solveig Sundborg, a Danish film actress
 Solveig Rogstad, a Norwegian biathlete
 Solveig Rönn-Christiansson, a Swedish politician
 Solveig Torsvik, a Norwegian politician

Middle name
Heide Solveig Göttner, a German fantasy writer

Surname
 Martin Solveig, a French DJ

See also
 Gullveig
 Sól (Sun)

References 

 Nordic Names - Solveig
 Behind the Name - Solveig

Germanic given names
Scandinavian feminine given names
Danish feminine given names
Icelandic feminine given names
Norwegian feminine given names
Swedish feminine given names